The 1998–99 NBA season was the Jazz's 25th season in the National Basketball Association, and 20th season in Salt Lake City, Utah. On March 23, 1998, the owners of all 29 NBA teams voted 27–2 to reopen the league's collective bargaining agreement, seeking changes to the league's salary cap system, and a ceiling on individual player salaries. The National Basketball Players Association (NBPA) opposed to the owners' plan, and wanted raises for players who earned the league's minimum salary. After both sides failed to reach an agreement, the owners called for a lockout, which began on July 1, 1998, putting a hold on all team trades, free agent signings and training camp workouts, and cancelling many NBA regular season and preseason games. Due to the lockout, the NBA All-Star Game, which was scheduled to be played in Philadelphia on February 14, 1999, was also cancelled. However, on January 6, 1999, NBA commissioner David Stern, and NBPA director Billy Hunter finally reached an agreement to end the lockout. The deal was approved by both the players and owners, and was signed on January 20, ending the lockout after 204 days. The regular season began on February 5, and was cut short to just 50 games instead of the regular 82-game schedule.

The Jazz entered the season once again as runners-up in the NBA Finals, having lost back-to-back NBA Finals to the Chicago Bulls, both in six games. However, with Michael Jordan retiring for a second time, Scottie Pippen being traded to the Houston Rockets, Dennis Rodman signing with the Los Angeles Lakers as a free agent, and Phil Jackson's contract expiring, the Bulls dynasty that headlined much of the 1990s was dramatically dismantled, and the Jazz hoped to make the NBA Finals for a third time. During the off-season, the team re-signed free agent, and former Jazz forward Thurl Bailey, who came out of his retirement. Bailey last played for the Minnesota Timberwolves during the 1993–94 season. The Jazz got off to a 19–4 start, and then posted an 11-game winning streak in April. However, they struggled a bit down the stretch as they lost their grip on first place, but managed to finish with a league best record of 37–13. However, their record was tied by the San Antonio Spurs, who won the Midwest Division by a tie-breaker. They made their sixteenth consecutive trip to the playoffs.

Karl Malone averaged 23.8 points and 9.4 rebounds per game, and was named Most Valuable Player for the second time, while being named to the All-NBA First Team, and NBA All-Defensive First Team. In addition, Bryon Russell returned to the starting lineup after coming off the bench last season, averaging 12.4 points, 5.3 rebounds and 1.5 steals per game, while Jeff Hornacek contributed 12.2 points per game, and John Stockton provided the team with 11.1 points, 7.5 assists and 1.6 steals per game, and was selected to the All-NBA Third Team. Greg Ostertag averaged 7.3 rebounds and 2.7 blocks per game, while off the bench, Shandon Anderson contributed 8.5 points per game, and Howard Eisley provided with 7.5 points and 3.7 assists per game. Head coach Jerry Sloan finished in third place in Coach of the Year voting.

In the Western Conference First Round of the playoffs, the Jazz faced elimination as they trailed 2–1 against the 6th–seeded Sacramento Kings. However, they won Game 4 on the road, 90–89, and went on to win the series in five games. In the Western Conference Semi-finals, they struggled and lost to the Pacific Division champion Portland Trail Blazers in six games.

Following the season, Anderson signed as a free agent with the Houston Rockets, while Greg Foster signed with the Seattle SuperSonics, and Bailey retired for the second time.

For the season, the Jazz added new black alternate road uniforms with brown side panels to their jerseys and shorts, which remained in use until 2004.

Draft picks

Roster

Regular season

Season standings

Record vs. opponents

Game log

Playoffs

|- align="center" bgcolor="#ccffcc"
| 1
| May 8
| Sacramento
| W 117–87
| Karl Malone (21)
| Greg Ostertag (9)
| Karl Malone (9)
| Delta Center19,911
| 1–0
|- align="center" bgcolor="#ffcccc"
| 2
| May 10
| Sacramento
| L 90–101
| Karl Malone (33)
| Karl Malone (10)
| Eisley, Stockton (6)
| Delta Center19,911
| 1–1
|- align="center" bgcolor="#ffcccc"
| 3
| May 12
| @ Sacramento
| L 81–84 (OT)
| Karl Malone (22)
| Karl Malone (13)
| Malone, Stockton (5)
| ARCO Arena17,317
| 1–2
|- align="center" bgcolor="#ccffcc"
| 4
| May 14
| @ Sacramento
| W 90–89
| Karl Malone (23)
| Karl Malone (16)
| John Stockton (8)
| ARCO Arena17,317
| 2–2
|- align="center" bgcolor="#ccffcc"
| 5
| May 16
| Sacramento
| W 99–92 (OT)
| Karl Malone (20)
| Karl Malone (12)
| John Stockton (14)
| Delta Center19,911
| 3–2
|-

|- align="center" bgcolor="#ccffcc"
| 1
| May 18
| Portland
| W 93–83
| Karl Malone (25)
| Karl Malone (12)
| John Stockton (7)
| Delta Center19,911
| 1–0
|- align="center" bgcolor="#ffcccc"
| 2
| May 20
| Portland
| L 81–84
| Karl Malone (23)
| Karl Malone (17)
| John Stockton (9)
| Delta Center19,911
| 1–1
|- align="center" bgcolor="#ffcccc"
| 3
| May 22
| @ Portland
| L 87–97
| Karl Malone (25)
| Karl Malone (14)
| John Stockton (5)
| Rose Garden20,720
| 1–2
|- align="center" bgcolor="#ffcccc"
| 4
| May 23
| @ Portland
| L 75–81
| Malone, Russell (17)
| Karl Malone (11)
| John Stockton (10)
| Rose Garden20,720
| 1–3
|- align="center" bgcolor="#ccffcc"
| 5
| May 25
| Portland
| W 88–71
| Karl Malone (23)
| Ostertag, Russell (9)
| John Stockton (14)
| Delta Center19,911
| 2–3
|- align="center" bgcolor="#ffcccc"
| 6
| May 27
| @ Portland
| L 80–92
| Jeff Hornacek (21)
| Karl Malone (7)
| John Stockton (10)
| Rose Garden20,727
| 2–4
|-

Player statistics

NOTE: Please write players statistics in alphabetical order by last name.

Season

Playoffs

Awards and records
 Karl Malone, NBA Most Valuable Player Award
 Karl Malone, All-NBA First Team
 John Stockton, All-NBA Third Team
 Karl Malone, NBA All-Defensive First Team

Transactions

References

Utah Jazz seasons
Utah
Utah
Utah